"The Last Time" is a song written by Kris Kristofferson and recorded by Johnny Cash for his 1980 album Rockabilly Blues.

Released in 1980 as a single (Columbia 11-11399, with "Rockabilly Blues (Texas 1955)" on the B-side) from that album, the song reached number 85 on U.S. Billboard country chart for the week of December 6.

Kristofferson also recorded the song himself, his version appears on the 1981 album To the Bone.

Track listing

Charts

References

External links 
 "The Last Time" on the Johnny Cash official website

Johnny Cash songs
1980 songs
1980 singles
Songs written by Kris Kristofferson
Song recordings produced by Earl Poole Ball
Columbia Records singles